There are over 130 titles in the Mega Man series. In all cases, the English title is given first, as well as the initial release date.

Mega Man series

Mega Man (Rockman) – Famicom/NES, 1987 (JP, US)
Mega Man 2 (Rockman 2: Dr. Wily no Nazo) – Famicom/NES, 1988 (JP), 1989 (US)
Mega Man 3 (Rockman 3: Dr. Wily no Saigo!?) – Famicom/NES, Arcade, 1990 (JP, US)
Mega Man 4 (Rockman 4: Aratanaru Yabou!!) – Famicom/NES, 1991 (JP), 1992 (US)
Mega Man 5 (Rockman 5: Blues no Wana!?) – Famicom/NES, 1992 (JP, US)
Mega Man 6 (Rockman 6: Shijō Saidai no Tatakai!!) – Famicom/NES, 1993 (JP), 1994 (US)
Mega Man 7 (Rockman 7: Shukumei no Taiketsu!) – Super Famicom/SNES, 1995 (JP, US)
Mega Man 8 (Rockman 8: Metal Heroes) – PlayStation & Sega Saturn, 1996 (JP), 1997 (US)
Mega Man & Bass (Rockman & Forte) – Super Famicom, 1998 (JP); Game Boy Advance, 2002 (US, JP)
Mega Man 9 (Rockman 9: Yabou no Fukkatsu!!) – WiiWare, PlayStation 3, Xbox 360, 2008
Mega Man 10 (Rockman 10: Uchū kara no Kyōi!!) – WiiWare, PlayStation 3, Xbox 360, 2010
Mega Man 11 (Rockman 11: Unmei no Haguruma!!) - PlayStation 4, Xbox One, Nintendo Switch, PC, 2018

The Game Boy versions of Mega Man were originally released in Japan under the Rockman World title. All Game Boy titles have an original plot. Each game in the Game Boy series, excluding Mega Man V, features four bosses from its corresponding NES version and four bosses from the succeeding NES game in the series. I.e: the Game Boy version of Mega Man III features bosses from the NES versions of Mega Man 3 and Mega Man 4. The Game Boy Mega Man V features an all new set of antagonists called the Star Droids, whose members are named after the planets of the Solar System.
Mega Man: Dr. Wily's Revenge (Rockman World) – Game Boy, 1991 – A handheld remake of Mega Man 1 and Mega Man 2.
Mega Man II (Rockman World 2) – Game Boy, 1991 – A handheld remake of Mega Man 2 and Mega Man 3.
Mega Man III (Rockman World 3) – Game Boy, 1992 – A handheld remake of Mega Man 3 and Mega Man 4.
Mega Man IV (Rockman World 4) – Game Boy, 1993 – A handheld remake of Mega Man 4 and Mega Man 5.
Mega Man V (Rockman World 5) – Game Boy, 1994 (had additional Super Game Boy support)

Spin-off titles
Platform game:

Street Fighter X Mega Man (Street Fighter X Rockman) – PC 2012

Street Fighter X Mega Man is a project developed by Zong Hui, combining Mega Man's gameplay with characters and settings from the Street Fighter series. Initially developed as a fan game by Hui, Capcom funded the project and provided creative direction and QA support. The game has been released as a free download on December 17, 2012.

Sports games:
Mega Man Soccer (Rockman's Soccer) (Japan/US only) – SNES, 1994
Mega Man: Battle & Chase (Rockman: Battle & Chase) (Japan/Europe only until Mega Man X Collection) – PlayStation, 1997

Fighting games:
Mega Man: The Power Battle (Rockman: The Power Battle) – Arcade, 1995
Mega Man 2: The Power Fighters (Rockman 2: The Power Fighters) – Arcade, 1996

Other:
Panic Shot! Rockman (Japan only) – pinball machine, 1992
Wily & Right no RockBoard: That's Paradise (Japan only) – Famicom, 1993
Super Adventure Rockman (Japan only) – PlayStation/Sega Saturn, 1998
Pachislot Rockman Ability (Japan only) – pachislot, 2018

Re-releases and collections
Re-releases/Remakes:
Mega Man (US only) – Game Gear, 1995 – A handheld remake of Mega Man 4 and Mega Man 5.
Mega Man & Bass (Rockman & Forte) – Game Boy Advance, 2002 – A port of the Super Famicom game Rockman & Forte, though this version saw international release.
Mega Man Powered Up (Rockman Rockman) – PlayStation Portable, 2006 – An enhanced remake of the original Mega Man, which adds, among other things, two new boss characters.

Collections:
Mega Man: The Wily Wars (Rockman Mega World) – Mega Drive/Sega Channel for Sega Genesis, 1994 – A collection of enhanced remakes of the first three Famicom/NES games, as well as its own game, Wily Tower.
Rockman Complete Works (Japan only) – PlayStation, 1999 – Enhanced remakes of Rockman 1-6, released individually. The remakes contain special features, including a PocketStation uplink, a Robot Master database, an "easy" difficulty level, and remixed music. The Complete Works titles were re-released in 2003 with the PocketStation feature removed.
Rockman Collection Special Box (Japan only) – PlayStation 2, 2003 – A collection of the six Rockman Complete Works games and Rockman X7.
Mega Man Anniversary Collection (North America only) – Nintendo GameCube/PlayStation 2/Xbox, 2004 – An English-version release of the Rockman Complete Works games (albeit with most of the special features removed), together with ports of Mega Man 7 and Mega Man 8 and the two elusive arcade games. 
Mega Man Legacy Collection (Rockman Classics Collection) – PlayStation 4/Xbox One/Microsoft Windows/Nintendo 3DS, 2015 – A collection of the first six Mega Man titles. The collection was developed by Digital Eclipse Software, and was first released in August 2015, with the 3DS port being released in 2016. 
Mega Man Legacy Collection 2 (Rockman Classics Collection 2) – PlayStation 4/Xbox One/Microsoft Windows, 2017 – A collection including Mega Man 7-10 and all their downloadable content. The collection is developed by Capcom and was released on August 8, 2017. 
Mega Man Legacy Collection 1 + 2 (Rockman Classics Collection 1 + 2) - A re-release of Mega Man Legacy Collection and Mega Man Legacy Collection 2 on the Nintendo Switch. The physical release comes with a game card for Mega Man Legacy Collection, and a free DLC code for downloading Mega Man Legacy Collection 2 which is only available in digital format. It was released on May 22, 2018.

Fighting games collections:
Rockman Battle & Fighters (Japan only) – Neo Geo Pocket Color, 2000 – A handheld port of Mega Man: The Power Battle and Mega Man 2: The Power Fighters.
Rockman Power Battle Fighters (Japan only) – PlayStation 2, 2004 – A Japanese-only port of the two arcade games, Mega Man: The Power Battle and Mega Man 2: The Power Fighters, including a new 2-player competitive mode.

Mobile phone games
Capcom of Japan has released several Rockman games for mobile phones in Japan. Only the first two games, Rockman Space Rescue and Mega Man Rocket Christmas were ported for international cell phones; on the other hand, Mega Man Rush Marine was created specifically for international audiences. In 2017 Capcom released ports of the first six NES Mega Man games to iOS and Android devices.

Mega Man, 2003
Mega Man 2, 2007
Mega Man 3, 2008
Rockman 3 Dr. Wily no Saigo!?, 2004
Rockman 4 Arata Naru Yabō!!, 2005
Rockman 5 Blues no Wana?!, 2006
Rockman 6 Shijō Saidai no Tatakai!!, 2007
Jump! Rockman, 2004
Rockman Bug Sweeper, 2003
Rockman Panic Fire, 2003
Rockman Space Rescue, 2003
Mega Man Rocket Christmas, 2003
Rockman Slot, 2003
Rockman GP, 2004
Rockman Pinball, 2004
Rockman DASH Golf, 2003
Rockman DASH 15 Panel, 2002
Kobun Flies?, 2001
Tide Coming Kobun, 2001
Kobun Assembly, 2001
Watch Kobun, 2001
Rockman.EXE: Phantom of Network, 2004
Rockman.EXE: Legend of Network, 2006
Rockman X, 2007
Rockman DASH - Grand 5 Island Adventure, 2008
Rockman X2, 2009
Rockman X3, 2010
Rockman Tennis, 2010
Mega Man Rush Marine, 2010
Intuition! Rockman, 2010
Rockman Diver, 2011
Rockman the Puzzle Battle, 2011
Rockman´s Sprite Logic, 2011
Rockman Xover (Japan only) – iOS, 2012 (servers closed on March 31, 2015)
Otoranger, 2013
Mega Man Mobile, 2017
Mega Man Mobile 2, 2017
Mega Man Mobile 3, 2017
Mega Man Mobile 4, 2017
Mega Man Mobile 5, 2017
Mega Man Mobile 6, 2017
Rockman X DiVE, 2020

Licensed games
Mega Man (North America only) – PC, 1990
Mega Man III (North America only) – PC, 1992
Rockman & Forte Mirai kara no Chōsensha (Japan only) – WonderSwan, 1999
Rockman Gold Empire (China only) - PC, 1999
Rockman Strategy (Taiwan only) – PC, 2001

In 1990, Hi-Tech Expressions (under license from Capcom) produced a DOS game based on the series simply titled Mega Man. It was followed by a second DOS game titled Mega Man III in 1992. Both games were released exclusively in North America. Despite their titles, neither games are ports of their corresponding NES counterparts, but original games. There was no PC game titled Mega Man II. Aside from handing the license to Hi-Tech Expressions, Capcom themselves were not directly involved in the PC games. Both games were programmed and designed by Stephen Rozner.

In 1999, Chinese developer Strawberry Soft created a game very similar to Wily & Right no RockBoard: That's Paradise called Rockman Gold Empire.

In 2001, the Dreams Comes True corporation released under license from Capcom an original Microsoft Windows game titled Rockman Strategy exclusively for the Taiwanese market. The game features a group of new robots led by Apollo and Luna and named after the western Zodiac as well as a new ally named Fan, with the former being tricked into serving Dr. Wily.

Mega Man X series

Mega Man X (Rockman X) – Super Famicom/SNES, PC, Virtual Console, 1993
Mega Man X2 (Rockman X2) – Super Famicom/SNES, Virtual Console, 1994
Mega Man X3 (Rockman X3) – Super Famicom/SNES, PC, PlayStation, Sega Saturn 1995, 1996
Mega Man X4 (Rockman X4) – PlayStation, Sega Saturn, PC, 1997
Mega Man X5 (Rockman X5) – PlayStation, PC, 2000
Mega Man X6 (Rockman X6) – PlayStation, PC (South Korea only), 2001
Mega Man X7 (Rockman X7) – PlayStation 2, PC (Asia only), 2003
Mega Man X8 (Rockman X8) – PlayStation 2, PC, 2004

Spin-offs
Mega Man Xtreme (Rockman X: Cyber Mission) – Game Boy Color, 2000
Mega Man Xtreme 2 (Rockman X2: Soul Eraser) – Game Boy Color, 2001
Mega Man X: Command Mission (Rockman X: Command Mission) – GameCube, PlayStation 2, 2004
Rockman X DiVE – iOS, Android, PC 2020, 2021

Re-releases and collections
Mega Man X3 (Rockman X3) – PlayStation, Sega Saturn, PC, 1996 – A enhanced port which includes new animated scenes and remixed music.
Rockman Collection Special Box – PlayStation 2, 2003 – A collection of the six Rockman Complete Works games and Rockman X7.
Mega Man X Collection (North America only) – GameCube, PlayStation 2, 2005/2006 – A collection featuring the first six Mega Man X titles and Mega Man Battle & Chase.
Mega Man Maverick Hunter X (Irregular Hunter X) – PlayStation Portable, 2005 – A remake of the original Mega Man X.
Mega Man X Legacy Collection (Rockman X Anniversary Collection) – PlayStation 4/Xbox One/Nintendo Switch/Microsoft Windows, 2018 – A collection including Mega Man X-X4. Released on July 24, 2018, and July 26, 2018 for the Japanese release. Sold as a single release in a digital and physical format, the latter being released in Japan only, and a combo physical release with Mega Man X Legacy Collection 2 for all regions. It is the first ever Mega Man game that receive a "T" rating by the ESRB in North America. 
Mega Man X Legacy Collection 2 (Rockman X Anniversary Collection 2) – PlayStation 4/Xbox One/Nintendo Switch/Microsoft Windows, 2018 – A collection including Mega Man X5-X8. Released on July 24, 2018, and July 26, 2018 for the Japanese release. Sold as a single release in a digital and physical format, the latter being released in Japan only, and a combo physical release with Mega Man X Legacy Collection for all regions. Like Mega Man Legacy Collection 2, the Nintendo Switch combo release for this game is also available in digital format only but is given a DLC Code to download it for free. Like the first volume, it also receives a "T" rating by the ESRB in North America.

Mega Man Legends series
 Mega Man Legends/Mega Man 64 (Rockman Dash - Episode 1: Hagane no Bōkenshin) – PlayStation, Nintendo 64, PC, PlayStation Portable (Japan only), 1997, 1998
The Misadventures of Tron Bonne (Tron ni Kobun) – PlayStation, 1999, 2000 - a prequel set before the events of the original Mega Man Legends.
Mega Man Legends 2 (Rockman Dash 2 - Episode 2: Ōinaru Isan) – PlayStation, PC, PlayStation Portable (Japan only) 2000
Rockman DASH Zhěngjiù Dìqiú Dà Màoxiǎn (Taiwan only) - PC, 1999
Rockman DASH - 5tsu no Shima no Daibouken! (Japan only) – Cell Phone, 2008

Mega Man Battle Network series

Mega Man Battle Network (Battle Network Rockman EXE) – Game Boy Advance, 2001
Mega Man Battle Network 2 (Battle Network Rockman EXE 2) – Game Boy Advance, 2001
Mega Man Battle Network 3 White & Blue (Battle Network Rockman EXE 3) – Game Boy Advance, 2002, 2003
Mega Man Battle Network 4 Red Sun & Blue Moon (Rockman EXE 4: Tournament Red Sun & Tournament Blue Moon) – Game Boy Advance, 2003
Mega Man Battle Network 5 Team Protoman & Team Colonel (Rockman EXE 5: Team of Blues & Team of Colonel) – Game Boy Advance, 2004, 2005
Mega Man Battle Network 5: Double Team DS (Rockman EXE 5 DS: Twin Leaders) – Nintendo DS, 2005
Mega Man Battle Network 6 Cybeast Falzar & Cybeast Gregar (Rockman EXE 6: Dennōjū Falzar & Dennōjū Gregar) – Game Boy Advance, 2005

Spin-offs 
Role-playing video games:
Rockman EXE Phantom of Network (Japan only) – Cell Phone, 2004
Rockman EXE The Medal Operation (Japan only) – Arcade, 2005
Rockman EXE Legend of Network (Japan only) – Cell Phone, 2006
Rockman EXE Operate Shooting Star (Japan only) – Nintendo DS, 2009 – An enhanced port of the first Mega Man Battle Network title.

Platform games:
Mega Man Network Transmission (Rockman EXE Transmission) – Nintendo GameCube, 2003
Rockman EXE WS (Japan only) – WonderSwan Color, 2003

Battle games:
Mega Man Battle Chip Challenge (Rockman EXE Battle Chip GP) – Game Boy Advance, 2003
Rockman EXE N1 Battle (Japan only) – WonderSwan Color, 2003
Rockman EXE 4.5 Real Operation (Japan only) – Game Boy Advance, 2004
Rockman EXE Battle Chip Stadium (Japan only) – Arcade, 2005

Collections:
Mega Man Battle Network Legacy Collection (Rockman.EXE Advanced Collection) – PlayStation 4/Nintendo Switch/Microsoft Windows, 2023

Mega Man Zero series

Mega Man Zero (Rockman Zero) – Game Boy Advance, 2002
Mega Man Zero 2 (Rockman Zero 2) – Game Boy Advance, 2003
Mega Man Zero 3 (Rockman Zero 3) – Game Boy Advance, 2004
Mega Man Zero 4 (Rockman Zero 4) – Game Boy Advance, 2005
Mega Man Zero Collection (Rockman Zero Collection) – Nintendo DS, 2010
Mega Man Zero/ZX Legacy Collection (Rockman Zero & ZX Double Hero Collection) – PlayStation 4/Xbox One/Nintendo Switch/Microsoft Windows, 2020

Mega Man ZX series
Mega Man ZX (Rockman ZX) – Nintendo DS, 2006
Mega Man ZX Advent (Rockman ZX Advent) – Nintendo DS, 2007
Mega Man Zero/ZX Legacy Collection (Rockman Zero & ZX Double Hero Collection) – PlayStation 4/Xbox One/Nintendo Switch/Microsoft Windows, 2020

Mega Man Star Force series

Mega Man Star Force: Pegasus, Leo & Dragon (Ryūsei no Rockman: Pegasus, Leo & Dragon) – Nintendo DS, 2006
Mega Man Star Force 2: Zerker × Ninja & Zerker × Saurian (Ryūsei no Rockman 2: Berserk × Shinobi & Berserk × Dinosaur) – Nintendo DS, 2007
Mega Man Star Force 3: Black Ace & Red Joker (Ryūsei no Rockman 3: Black Ace & Red Joker) (Japan/US only) – Nintendo DS, 2008

Cancelled games
Rockman X Interactive - an interactive game that entered pre-production in the mid-1990s and influenced the direction of Super Adventure Rockman
Mega Man X3 (Rockman X3) - 3DO Interactive Multiplayer cancelled in 1996
Mega Man Anniversary Collection – Game Boy Advance, cancelled January 2006 – It was said to include the first five original Game Boy Mega Man games, including colorized versions and unlockable artwork, but Capcom confirmed on its US forums that the game was no longer in production, due to cost issues.
Mega Man Star Force 4 – Nintendo DS, cancelled between 2009 and 2010
Maverick Hunter (Planned to be an FPS Trilogy) – unknown platforms, cancelled late 2010
Mega Man Universe – Xbox 360 and PlayStation 3, cancelled March 2011
Mega Man Legends 3 (Rockman DASH 3) – Nintendo 3DS, cancelled July 2011
Rockman Online – PC massively multiplayer online game, cancelled November 2012
Wily & Right no RockBoard: That's Paradise – Game Boy, cancelled 1994
Rockman ZX "C" – Nintendo DS, cancelled 2008
Rockman XZ Time Rift – mobile, cancelled 2021

References

External links
 Capcom's official Rockman 30th anniversary site
 Capcom's official Rockman 20th anniversary site
 Capcom's official Rockman 15th anniversary site

 
Mega Man